Tethytrygon is an extinct genus of stingray in the family Dasyatidae.

References
   Shark references - Extinct - complete list

Dasyatis